The 1924 Oregon Webfoots football team represented the University of Oregon in the Pacific Coast Conference (PCC) during the 1924 college football season.  In their first and only season under head coach Joe Maddock, the Webfoots compiled a 4–2–3 record (2–2–1 against PCC opponents), finished in sixth place in the PCC, and outscored their opponents, 94 to 60. The team played its home games at Hayward Field in Eugene, Oregon.

Schedule

References

Oregon
Oregon Ducks football seasons
Oregon Webfoots football